The 1869 Antrim by-election was fought on 21 August 1869.  The by-election was fought due to the death of the incumbent MP of the Conservative Party, George Henry Seymour.  It was won by the Conservative candidate Hugh de Grey Seymour.

References

1869 elections in the United Kingdom
By-elections to the Parliament of the United Kingdom in County Antrim constituencies
19th century in County Antrim
August 1869 events
1869 elections in Ireland